Howard Major Buckley (January 23, 1863 – July 2, 1941), was a United States Marine private received the Medal of Honor for actions during the Philippine–American War. He was one of three Marines (along with Thomas Francis Prendergast and Joseph Leonard) attached to the Eighth Army Corps for the war. Buckley was awarded the medal for actions on March 25, 27, and 29 and April 4, 1899.

Buckley joined the Marine Corps from Brooklyn in July 1896, and received a bad conduct discharge in June 1913.

Medal of Honor citation
Rank and organization: Private, U.S. Marine Corps. Born: January 23, 1868, Croton Falls, N.Y. Accredited to: New York. G.O. No.: 55, July 19, 1901.

Citation:

For distinguished conduct in the presence of the Enemy in battle while with the Eighth Army Corps on 25, 27, March 29, and April 4, 1899.

See also

List of Medal of Honor recipients
List of Philippine–American War Medal of Honor recipients

Notes

External links

United States Marines
1863 births
1941 deaths
United States Marine Corps Medal of Honor recipients
People from Croton-on-Hudson, New York
Military personnel from New York (state)
American military personnel of the Philippine–American War
Philippine–American War recipients of the Medal of Honor